Komary is a rural locality (a village) in Golovinskoye Rural Settlement, Sudogodsky District, Vladimir Oblast, Russia. The population was 6 as of 2010.

Geography 
Komary is located 27 km northwest of Sudogda (the district's administrative centre) by road. Lukinskogo doma invalidov is the nearest rural locality.

References

External links 
ITV article about a Komary soldier killed in Ukrain https://www.itv.com/news/2022-04-19/in-putins-heartland-russian-mothers-mourn-their-sons-killed-in-ukraine

Rural localities in Sudogodsky District